Renzo de' Vidovich (born 27 February 1934) is an Italian politician,
historian and journalist.

Biography
Born and growth up in Zadar (then official Zara), from the old noble Dalmatian family of de' Vidovich, Counts Capocesto e Ragosniza; he  is a close cousin of Ottavio Missoni. He left Zadar for the exile at the beginning of the massive bombing of the city made by Allies in 1943. He moved to Trieste where he was general secretary of the board of students movement which assumed the responsibility of convening the riots of 5 and 6 November 1953 in support of the return of Trieste to Italy, that time occupied by the Anglo-American Allied Military Government.

Six Italians died during the fighting and there were a total of 153 wounded. The following year there was the reunification of Trieste to Italy. According with a de' Vidovic proposal, supported by the Lega nazionale di Trieste, the Government Berlusconi II awarded the National civil gold medal to the dead fighters specifying that were decisive for the return of Trieste to its motherland.

While he was student at University of Trieste, de' Vidovich was editor of the newspaper La zona franca ("The Free Zone") which will result decisive for the creation of a national economic free zone of Trieste. In 1968 he became secretary of the national labor union Cisnal, today Unione Generale Lavoro (UGL), in Trieste.

He founded and directed La Città, an information magazine. Member of the municipal council of Trieste for more than ten years, he was also elected as city councilor in the town of Duino-Aurisina where he fought for the touristic development of Sistiana.

In 1972 de' Vidovich was elected to the Italian Chamber of Deputies for the Trieste electoral district, and was appointed secretary of the parliamentary group of the post-fascist Italian Social Movement.

He was also mayor of the Free Comune of Zara in Exile.

In 1999 he was appointed as president of the Federation of Exiles from Istria, Fiume and Dalmatia. As president of the Rustia-Traine Foundation he participates actively to the creation of the Italian communities in Dalmatia: Zadar, Split, Hvar and Kotor. He also promoted courses of Italian language and culture in Dalmatia, and, in 2004, he founded the Centro di Ricerche Culturali Dalmate (Dalmatian Cultural Research Centre) in Split of which de' Vidovich is still  chairman. The center promotes the publication - in collaboration with the Veneto Region - of numerous books on the cultural heritage of Dalmatia and Venice.

Books and newspapers  
In the 1970s de' Vidovich collaborated with Il Borghese, Candido (humor weekly magazine) and Il Secolo d'Italia. In 1996 he re-founded  Il Dalmata, published since 1865 and abolished by Austria-Hungary in 1916; he later published, in 1992, Dalmatia region of Europe, followed by I Dalmati per Trieste and L'albo d'oro di nobili patrizi e nomi illustri nel Regno di Dalmazia ("Hall of honour of noble patricians and illustrious names in the Kingdom of Dalmatia.") He wrote numerous articles on Dalmatian press.

Notes

External links 

 Site of the Italian exiles of Dalmatia - Foundation Rustia-Traine, Trieste

1934 births
Living people
Politicians from Zadar
Dalmatian Italians
Italian Social Movement politicians
20th-century Italian politicians
Italians of Croatia
Italian fascists
Italian irredentism